Antiques and The Arts Weekly is an American, national weekly magazine covering art and antiques.

History
Antiques and The Arts Weekly was founded in 1963 by R. Scudder Smith, publisher of the Newtown Bee, a newspaper covering Newtown, Connecticut that was founded by Smith's grandfather in 1877. in 1988 the Weekly had a paid circulation of 23,000 in Europe, Canada and the United States. A publication for the trade, the Weekly is regarded as an important source of journalism about the American and Canadian antiques market.

In 1991 architect Roger P. Ferris of Southport, Connecticut, designed a large, new, printing plant for the Weekly, with  a fieldstone base and cedar shingle walls and roof designed to fit in with Newtown's carefully preserved historic look.

References

1963 establishments in Connecticut
Hobby magazines published in the United States
Magazines established in 1963
Magazines published in Connecticut
Professional and trade magazines
Visual arts magazines published in the United States